Wildcat's Revenge is an upcoming steel hybrid coaster at Hersheypark in Hershey, Pennsylvania, United States. Originally constructed as a wooden roller coaster named Wildcat, it was the first roller coaster manufactured by Great Coasters International (GCI). It opened to the public on May 26, 1996, as the anchor attraction of the Midway America section of the park. The roller coaster cost $5.6 million was built on a  plot that had previously been used for parking. The ride traversed a 90-foot lift hill and twelve banked turns, subjecting riders to forces of up to 3.5 Gs. From 1998 to 2009, Wildcat ranked among the top 50 wooden roller coasters in the Golden Ticket Awards. Wildcat initially received critical acclaim, but it gained a negative reputation for its increasing roughness.

Wildcat closed permanently in July 2022. Hersheypark announced in November 2022 that Rocky Mountain Construction (RMC) was converting the ride into a steel hybrid coaster named Wildcat's Revenge. The ride, scheduled to open in 2023, will contain four inversions along a  course.

History

Original development

In June 1995, the Hershey Entertainment and Resorts Company announced that it would build "The Wildcat", a wooden roller coaster at Hersheypark in Hershey, Pennsylvania, over the following year. The ride would be named after The Wild Cat, Hersheypark's first roller coaster, which operated from 1923 to 1945. The coaster was intended as the main attraction in Midway America, an area in Hersheypark themed to classic American attractions; construction of the themed area had begun the prior month. Wildcat was the first coaster constructed by Pennsylvania firm Great Coasters International (GCI). The  plot on which the ride was built had previously been used for parking.

The roller coaster was designed by Mike Boodley and Clair Hain Jr.; both men had cofounded GCI. The company started constructing Wildcat in August 1995. The roller coaster's trains were manufactured by Philadelphia Toboggan Coasters (PTC) between September 1995 and February 1996. Work on the ride was complicated by the North American blizzard of 1996, during which workers reportedly "had to dig out wood from snow". It was originally expected to open on May 11, 1996, along with an "inauguration celebration". Wildcat was planned to be part of "Physics Day" on May 17, where it would be used to demonstrate gravitational pulls. Wildcat cost $5.6 million to construct.

Wildcat ultimately opened to the media on May 23, 1996, and to the public on May 26, 1996. The ride's opening was accompanied by a one-hour-long television special called Wild Rides, which aired on the Discovery Channel on May 26, 1996. The original PTC trains were replaced in 2007 with 12-car Millennium Flyer trains manufactured by GCI.

Conversion
Hersheypark announced in July 2022 that Wildcat was scheduled to close permanently on July 31, 2022. Family members of Nicholas Pantalone, who had been one of the ride's operators before his death in 2013, were present on Wildcat's final ride. Following the announcement, the park posted on Twitter, "Any suggestions on what we could do with 3,100 feet of wooden track?" Rocky Mountain Construction (RMC) replied on Twitter stating, "We have a few ideas...". This led to speculation that RMC would rebuild the retired ride. RMC had previously rebuilt several wooden coasters, such as Twisted Colossus at Six Flags Magic Mountain, Twisted Timbers at Kings Dominion, and Wicked Cyclone at Six Flags New England; according to The York Dispatch, these rebuilds "might be a model for the closing Wildcat". At the time, a spokesperson for Hersheypark refused to confirm rumors of Wildcat's future, saying: "We will share details on what's next before the end of" 2022.

On November 2, 2022, Hersheypark confirmed that RMC was converting Wildcat into a hybrid roller coaster called Wildcat's Revenge. The ride would utilize the existing wooden infrastructure accompanied by steel track, with an expected opening in 2023. Hersheypark also began selling 160 pieces of wood, salvaged from the original GCI coaster, at a gift shop just outside the park. Installation of trackwork began on November 9. The next week, Hersheypark publicly displayed the front car of one of Wildcat's Revenge's new trains at the International Association of Amusement Parks and Attractions Expo in Orlando, Florida. Installation of the first inversion—the underflip, which used some of the old lift hill's structure—began in mid-December 2022 and was completed the next month.

Characteristics

Wooden roller coaster 

The station was shaped like a "Victorian station house" with a red, white, and blue paint scheme. Riders left the station and traversed a small right-hand drop. Riders then went on several similar drops before returning to the station. After the first drop, the ride ascended a left-hand curve, traveled through an airtime hill above the bottom of the first drop, and descended to the left beneath the lift hill. The train then traveled straight over another airtime hill before curving 270 degrees to the right. Passing over the bottom of the lift hill, the train curved left again, ascended another airtime hill, then descended another left-hand curve. The train next curved right and traversed another series of lift hills before entering the final brake run and making a sharp right turn into the station.

There were 11 or 12 banked turns in total, subjecting riders to forces of up to 3.5 Gs. The track crossed above and below itself 20 times. Wildcat was located on a relatively large hill, giving it the appearance of being taller than it actually was. At night, the track was illuminated by strings of lights. The roller coaster was constructed of prefabricated wooden pieces, allowing park officials to replace worn-out pieces easily. Wildcat also contained an on-ride camera; guests could purchase photos at a booth near the roller coaster's exit.

The ride originally ran with two trains manufactured by PTC. Both the PTC trains, and the GCI Millennium Flyer trains that replaced them in 2007, could fit 24 passengers each. The PTC trains had six cars, each of which had two rows of two seats, while the Millennium Flyer trains had twelve cars, each of which had one row of two seats. Each of the trains contained lap bar restraints. The ride had a maximum throughput of 1,000 guests per hour.

Steel roller coaster 
As of 2022, the former Wildcat was being converted into a steel roller coaster manufactured by RMC. The ride will contain four inversions and will reuse most of the original wooden roller coaster's support structure. The ride is expected to feature the world's largest underflip inversion, which Hersheypark officials described as ascending upwards before the train twists counterclockwise into a 270° roll before descending down. One cycle of the ride is expected to last 2 minutes and 36 seconds. The roller coaster contains red track, as well as black supports made of wood and steel.

Wildcat's Revenge will operate with three custom trains. Each train has six cars that contain two rows of two seats, allowing a maximum capacity of 24 people per train. The trains will be themed to wildcats and will be painted black, charcoal, and silver.

Comparison

Reception
When the original Wildcat opened, Erik Arneson of the Lebanon Daily News wrote: "I'm a fan of multiple loops ... but the Wildcat is the fastest roller coaster I've ever been on, and it's exciting from start to finish." Lisa Wiseman of the York Daily Record said at the ride's opening: "The Wildcat is indeed a wild ride, but surprisingly, a smooth ride." According to Randy Kraft of the Associated Press, "After the top of the first hill, it seems to have almost no sections of straight track. There's no chance to catch your breath or orient yourself." Elizabeth Arneson of the Lebanon, Pennsylvania, Daily News wrote in 1998: "The top speed is listed at 45 mph at Hersheypark's Web site, but the ride feels much faster. [...] there is little time for sightseeing as the coaster hits banked turn after banked turn." By the time Wildcat closed in 2022, it had become noticeably rough.

Rankings

References

External links 
 

Hersheypark
Hybrid roller coasters
Roller coasters in Pennsylvania
Roller coasters planned to open in 2023